Live at Budokan is a CD/DVD combination released by heavy metal singer Ozzy Osbourne on 25 June 2002. It was recorded at the Nippon Budokan on 15 February 2002 in Tokyo, Japan.

The DVD is largely shot in widescreen, except for the drum cam behind Mike Bordin that is pointed towards the audience, which is shot in 4:3. The picture format is standard 4:3 aspect, with letterboxing for all of the widescreen shots. The DVD also contains bonus The Osbournes styled features.

Also, the DVD features the song "Suicide Solution" and Zakk Wylde's accompanying guitar solo. Running in excess of 13 minutes, this track was cut from the CD version because of time restraints.

Track listings

CD

DVD

Personnel
 Ozzy Osbourne – vocals, producer
 Zakk Wylde – guitars
 Robert Trujillo – bass
 Mike Bordin – drums
 John Sinclair – keyboards

Production
Thom Panunzio - producer, engineer, mixing
Yoshiyasu Kumada, German Villacorta - engineers
Stewart Whitmore - digital editing
Stephen Marcussen - mastering
Sharon Osbourne - executive producer

Charts

Weekly charts

Year-end charts

Certifications
Video

References

External links
 

Ozzy Osbourne live albums
2002 live albums
2002 video albums
Live video albums
Epic Records live albums
Epic Records video albums
Albums recorded at the Nippon Budokan
Albums produced by Thom Panunzio